Thomas Newton (1 January 1704 – 14 February 1782) was an English cleric, biblical scholar and author. He served as the Bishop of Bristol from 1761 to 1782.

Biography
Newton was educated at Trinity College, Cambridge and was subsequently elected a fellow of Trinity. He was ordained in the Church of England and continued scholarly pursuits. His more remembered works include his annotated edition of Paradise Lost, including a biography of John Milton, published in 1749. In 1754 he published a large scholarly analysis of the prophecies of the Bible, titled Dissertations on the Prophecies.  In his 1761 edition of Milton's poetry, he gave the title On His Blindness to Sonnet XIX, When I Consider How My Light is Spent.

Newton was appointed the Bishop of Bristol in 1761 and in 1768 became the Dean of St Paul's Cathedral in London.  He has been considered a Christian universalist.

One of Newton's famous quotes concerns the Jewish people:

The preservation of the Jews is really one of the most signal and illustrious acts of divine Providence... and what but a supernatural power could have preserved them in such a manner as none other nation upon earth hath been preserved.  Nor is the providence of God less remarkable in the destruction of their enemies, than in their preservation... We see that the great empires, which in their turn subdued and oppressed the people of God, are all come to ruin... And if such hath been the fatal end of the enemies and oppressors of the Jews, let it serve as a warning to all those, who at any time or upon any occasion are for raising a clamor and persecution against them.

References

Sources
Nigel Aston, ‘Newton, Thomas (1704–1782)’, Oxford Dictionary of National Biography, Oxford University Press, 2004, accessed 26 Aug 2008

External links

1704 births
1782 deaths
18th-century Church of England bishops
People from Lichfield
Bishops of Bristol
Deans of St Paul's
English Christian universalists
Alumni of Trinity College, Cambridge
Fellows of Trinity College, Cambridge
Canons of Westminster
Christian universalist clergy
18th-century Christian universalists
Anglican universalists
18th-century Anglican theologians